This is a list of operatic sopranos and mezzo-sopranos who were born in Norway or whose work is closely associated with that country.

A
Signe Amundsen (1899–1987), soprano in Milan's La Scala, the Opéra-Comique in Paris and at the National Theatre, Oslo
Bodil Arnesen (born 1967), soprano performing in operas and concerts in Europe, USA and Asia
Beate Asserson (1913–2000), mezzo-soprano, performed in the opera houses of Germany, Austria, Italy and France

B
Ingrid Bjoner (1927–2006), soprano noted for roles in the operas of Wagner and Richard Strauss, international concert soloist and recital performer
Anne Brown (1912-2009), American-born Norwegian soprano, active in Broadway musicals, later concert singer and recitalist in Europe

D
Lise Davidsen (born 1987), lyric operatic soprano, international concert singer and recitalist

E
Mari Eriksmoen (born 1983), operatic soprano who since 2006 has performed across Europe

F
Karen-Marie Flagstad (1904–1992), soprano, performed in operas in Oslo and across Europe
Kirsten Flagstad (1895–1962), outstanding Wagnerian soprano, Metropolitan Opera, Covent Garden, Bayreuth
Emilie da Fonseca (1803–1884), Norwegian-Danish actress and opera singer
Kari Frisell (1922–2022), soprano with the Norwegian National Opera until 1971, later voice teacher

G
Lona Gyldenkrone (1848–1934), soprano, performed in operas and concerts in Scandinavia, Germany and Russia

H
Haldis Halvorsen (1889–1936), operatic mezzo-soprano performing in Scandinavia and Germany 
Randi Heide Steen (1909–1990), soprano, performed in operettas and concerts in Oslo
Wilhelmine Holmboe-Schenström (1842–1938), mezzo-soprano concert performer and opera singer appearing in Scandinavia, Germany, France and Italy

K
Turid Karlsen (born 1961), soprano, performed mainly in Karlsruhe and Bonn but also in North America
Solveig Kringlebotn (born 1963), soprano, performed in concerts and recitals across Europe and in operas in New York and Paris
Lilleba Lund Kvandal (1940–2016), soprano soprano, appeared in opera houses and concert halls in Germany

L
Borghild Langaard (1883–1939), soprano in concerts of Grieg's songs and operas in Oslo and London
Aase Nordmo Løvberg (1923–2013), leading operatic soprano active at the Royal Swedish Opera and as a guest in Vienna, New York and London

M
Ann-Helen Moen (born 1969), lyric soprano, performances in operas and concerts in Norway, Austria, Germany and Switzerland

N
Elizabeth Norberg-Schulz (born 1959), Norwegian-Italian soprano and concert soloist, appearances in many of the world's leading opera houses
Eidé Norena (1884–1968), soprano active at La Scala, Royal Opera House and Metropolitan Opera, noted for Italian roles

O
Gina Oselio (1858–1937), mezzo-soprano remembered for her Carmen role at the Royal Swedish Opera

P
Eva Prytz (1917–1987), soprano with the Royal Swedish Opera until 1967, also concert soloist

S
Soffi Schønning (1895–1994), soprano active with the Royal Swedish Opera and in Oslo theatres, concert performer in London
Tuva Semmingsen (born 1975), opera singer, has performed both mezzo-soprano and coloratura roles, soloist with the Royal Danish Theatre
Marita Solberg (born 1976), active in opera in Stuttgart, Barcelona, Madrid and Berlin
Torhild Staahlen (1947–2021), mezzo-soprano with the Norwegian National Opera, also performed in opera and concerts in Germany, the UK and USA

V
Ingrid Vetlesen (born 1981), soloist performing at the Royal Danish Opera and in concerts and operas in Norway

W
Camilla Wiese (1845–1938), mezzo-soprano singer and voice teacher, performed at the Royal Swedish Opera as well as in Bergen and Oslo, also a recitalist

References

operatic sopranos
Norwegian operatic sopranos
Norwegian operatic sopranos